Gordon James Reid (born 16 August 1992) is an Australian physician and politician who has been the Labor MP for Robertson since the 2022 Australian federal election, when he defeated Liberal incumbent Lucy Wicks.

Reid is a Wiradjuri man who was born on Darkinjung country and grew up on the Central Coast. He attended Umina Beach Public School and Central Coast Grammar School, before studying medicine at the University of Newcastle, completing his B.Med. in 2016.

Reid previously worked as an emergency doctor. He said that he decided to run for Parliament while working in the Emergency Department at Wyong Hospital during the COVID-19 pandemic, seeing people waiting for treatment.

After his election in 2022, Reid is one of six First Nations people in the Labor Caucus. He speaks Indonesian and plays the saxophone.

References

Living people
Wiradjuri people
University of Newcastle (Australia) alumni
Australian Labor Party members of the Parliament of Australia
People from the Central Coast (New South Wales)
Members of the Australian House of Representatives for Robertson
21st-century Australian politicians
1992 births